Ali Bolaghi (also Romanized as ‘Alī Bolāghī) is a village in Dowlatabad Rural District, in the Central District of Namin County, Ardabil Province, Iran. At the 2006 census, its population was 372, in 90 families.

References 

Towns and villages in Namin County